Ek Din Achanak (Hindi: एक दिन अचानक, English: Suddenly, One Day) is a 1989 art film directed by Mrinal Sen, based on a Bengali novel, Beej by Ramapada Chowdhury.

Synopsis 
One evening, in the midst of torrential rains, a professor (Shreeram Lagoo) goes out for a walk and fails to return. As the evening stretches into days and the days into weeks with no sign of him, his family struggles to regain their footing and to understand what might have caused him to leave. Slowly they return to their daily activities. The professor's son Amit "Amu"(Arjun Chakraborty) establishes his fledgling business; his younger daughter Seema (Roopa Ganguly) resumes her studies at college; and his elder daughter, Neeta (Shabana Azmi), the backbone of the family, returns to her office job.

Behind the facade of normalcy, though, the family is deeply wounded. Amit enjoys success in his business but is bitter and dour. Seema passes with 'First Division' in College. Neeta has a very patient and supportive boyfriend Alok (Anjan Dutt), but the relationship is stuck in a holding pattern. And their mother (Uttara Baokar) suffers debilitating depression. Their hesitant attempts to piece together the professor's state of mind before his disappearance raise more questions than they answer: Was he having an affair with a former student (Aparna Sen)? Was his academic career crumbling? Was he a plagiarist?

Cast
Shabana Azmi - Neeta
Shriram Lagoo - Professor Shashank Ray (Neeta's father)
Aparna Sen  -  Aparna (Student)
 Uttara Baokar  - Sudha (Neeta's Mother)
 Roopa Ganguly - Seema (Neeta's sister)
 Arjun Chakraborty - Amit "Amu" (Neeta's brother)
 Manohar Singh - Neeta's uncle
 Anjan Dutt - Alok (Neeta's boyfriend)
 Lily Chakravarty - Neighbour
 Anil Chatterjee - Arunbabu

Awards
 1989: National Film Award for Best Supporting Actress: Uttara Baokar
 1989: Venice Film Festival: OCIC Award - Honorable Mention: Mrinal Sen

References

External links 
 
 Review at Filmi Geek

1989 films
1980s Hindi-language films
Films directed by Mrinal Sen
Films based on Indian novels
Films set in Kolkata
Films featuring a Best Supporting Actress National Film Award-winning performance
Indian avant-garde and experimental films
1980s avant-garde and experimental films
Films based on works by Ramapada Chowdhury